Lake Paringa is a small lake 50 kilometres north of Haast on the West Coast of New Zealand's South Island.

The Hall River drains its waters from the Lake Paringa. The Hall River flows to east and meets the Paringa River.

References

Westland District
Lakes of the West Coast, New Zealand